Ubisoft is a video game company based in Saint-Mandé, France. Founded by five brothers in 1986, Ubisoft is well known for developing franchises such as Assassin's Creed, Far Cry, Just Dance, Prince of Persia, Tom Clancy's franchise, Watch Dogs, The Crew, TrackMania, Trials and Rayman.

Lists of games 
 List of Ubisoft games: 1986–1999
 List of Ubisoft games: 2000–2009
 List of Ubisoft games: 2010–2019
 List of Ubisoft games: 2020–present

Other series 
Ubisoft became a leader in publishing "games for girls" for the Nintendo DS and Wii through the Imagine, Ener-G, and Petz series.

Cancelled games 

 Aliens Versus Predator for Game Boy Advance
 America's Army: Rise of a Soldier for PlayStation 2
 Animalz Marine Zoo for Nintendo DS
 Arcatera for Dreamcast
 Assassin's Creed: Lost Legacy for Nintendo 3DS
 Assassin's Creed Utopia for Android, iOS
 Babyz Party for Wii
 Bonx for Game Boy Advance
 Bratz: Formal Funk for PlayStation 2
 Brothers in Arms: Furious 4 for Windows, PlayStation 4, Xbox One
 Call of Juarez for Xbox
 Campus for PlayStation 2, Xbox
 Charlie's Angels for Game Boy Advance, Xbox
 Cloudberry Kingdom for PlayStation Vita
 Crouching Tiger, Hidden Dragon for GameCube
 Dance on Broadway for Nintendo DS
 Dragon Riders for Game Boy Color
 E.T.: Return to the Green Planet for PlayStation 2
 Far Cry Instincts for PlayStation 2
 F1 Racing Championship 2 for Windows, PlayStation 2
 Funky Barn for PlayStation 3
 Gold and Glory: The Road to El Dorado for Dreamcast
 Guitar Hits for PlayStation Portable
 Haze for Windows, Xbox 360
 Heroes for PlayStation 3, Xbox 360
 Imagine: Animal Doctor for Windows
 Killer Freaks from Outer Space for Wii U
 Killing Day for PlayStation 3, Xbox 360
 Larry Bond's Harpoon 4 for Windows
 Might & Magic Raiders for Browser
 My Life Coach for Nintendo DS
 Petz: Monkeyz House for Windows
 Project Q for Windows, PlayStation 4, PlayStation 5, Xbox One, Xbox Series X/S
 Steep for Nintendo Switch
 TMNT for PlayStation 3
 Tom Clancy's Ghost Recon 2 for Windows
 Tom Clancy's Ghost Recon Advanced Warfighter for GameCube
 Tom Clancy's Ghost Recon Advanced Warfighter 2 for Wii
 Tom Clancy's Ghost Recon Commander for Browser
 Tom Clancy's Ghost Recon: Frontline for multiple platforms
 Tom Clancy's Ghost Recon: Future Soldier for Nintendo DS, PlayStation Portable
 Tom Clancy's Ghost Recon: Island Thunder for PlayStation 2
 Tom Clancy's Ghost Recon Phantoms for Wii U
 Tom Clancy's Rainbow 6: Patriots for Windows, PlayStation 3, PlayStation 4, Xbox 360, Xbox One
 Tom Clancy's Rainbow Six: Critical Hour for PlayStation 2
 Tom Clancy's Rainbow Six: Rogue Spear for PlayStation 2
 Tom Clancy's Rainbow Six: Vegas for GameCube, PlayStation 2, Xbox
 Tom Clancy's Splinter Cell for Meta Quest 2
 V.I.P. for Dreamcast
 Wildwaters for Nintendo 64
 ZombiU 2 for Wii U

References 

 
Ubisoft